Rhithrodytes is a genus of beetle in family Dytiscidae. It contains the following species:

 Rhithrodytes agnus Foster, 1992
 Rhithrodytes bimaculatus (Dufour, 1852)
 Rhithrodytes crux (Fabricius, 1792)
 Rhithrodytes dorsoplagiatus (Fairmaire, 1880)
 Rhithrodytes numidicus (Bedel, 1889)
 Rhithrodytes sexguttatus (Aubé, 1838)

References

Dytiscidae genera
Taxonomy articles created by Polbot